Katzenberg may refer to:

People 

 Dena Katzenberg, American museum curator
 Jacob Katzenberg, New York crime figure
 Jeffrey Katzenberg, American film producer

Places 

 Katzenberg Tunnel
 Katzenberg Hillfort